Josef Vondrka (born 19 November 1952) is a Czech volleyball player. He competed in the men's tournament at the 1976 Summer Olympics.

References

External links
 

1952 births
Living people
Czech men's volleyball players
Olympic volleyball players of Czechoslovakia
Volleyball players at the 1976 Summer Olympics
People from Třeboň
Sportspeople from the South Bohemian Region